Homoeomeria (also written homœomeria, homeomeria, homoeomery, homœomery, homeomery) is the state or quality of being homogeneous in elements or first principles; likeness or identity of parts.

Biology
Homoeomeria (moth), a genus of moths in the family Erebidae

Philosophy
Homoeomeria (philosophy)